Icariin is a chemical compound classified as a prenylated flavonol glycoside, a type of flavonoid. It is the 8-prenyl derivative of kaempferol 3,7-O-diglucoside. The compound has been isolated from several species of plant belonging to the genus Epimedium which are commonly known as horny goat weed, Yin Yang Huo, and Herba epimedii. Extracts from these plants are reputed to produce aphrodisiac effects, and are used in traditional Chinese medicine to enhance erectile function. However, clinical trial data are lacking to support these claims.

References 

PDE5 inhibitors
Flavonol glucosides
Flavonol rhamnosides
Prenylflavonoids
Phenol ethers